CU-CPT4a is a drug which acts as a selective antagonist of Toll-like receptor 3 (TLR3), with an IC50 of 3.44 μM. It is used for research into the function of TRL3 and its role in inflammation, autoimmune disorders and cancer.

See also 
 CU-CPT9a

References 

Receptor antagonists
Benzothiophenes
Carboxylic acids
Organofluorides
Organochlorides
Amides